The team dressage in equestrian at the 2016 Summer Olympics in Rio de Janeiro was held at National Equestrian Center from 10 to 12 August.

Competition format

The team and individual dressage competitions used the same results. Dressage had three phases, with only the first two used in the team competition. The first phase was the Grand Prix. The top six teams advanced to the second phase, the Grand Prix Special. The results of that phase (ignoring the previous Grand Prix scores) produced the final results.

Schedule

Times are Brasília time, BRT (UTC−03:00)

Results

.

References

Team dressage